Kansafra  is a Syrian village located in Ihsim Nahiyah in Ariha District, Idlib.  According to the Syria Central Bureau of Statistics (CBS), Kansafra had a population of 7,496 in the 2004 census.

See also 

 December 2011 Jabal al-Zawiya massacres

References 

Populated places in Ariha District